In chemistry, non-stoichiometric compounds are chemical compounds, almost always solid inorganic compounds, having elemental composition whose proportions cannot be represented by a ratio of small natural numbers (i.e. an empirical formula); most often, in such materials, some small percentage of atoms are missing or too many atoms are packed into an otherwise perfect lattice work. 

Contrary to earlier definitions, modern understanding of non-stoichiometric compounds view them as homogeneous, and not mixtures of stoichiometric chemical compounds. Since the solids are overall electrically neutral, the defect is compensated by a change in the charge of other atoms in the solid, either by changing their oxidation state, or by replacing them with atoms of different elements with a different charge. Many metal oxides and sulfides have non-stoichiometric examples; for example, stoichiometric iron(II) oxide, which is rare, has the formula , whereas the more common material is nonstoichiometric, with the formula . The type of equilibrium defects in non-stoichiometric compounds can vary with attendant variation in bulk properties of the material. Non-stoichiometric compounds also exhibit special electrical or chemical properties because of the defects; for example, when atoms are missing, electrons can move through the solid more rapidly.  Non-stoichiometric compounds have applications in ceramic and superconductive material and in electrochemical (i.e., battery) system designs.

Occurrence

Iron oxides
Nonstoichiometry is pervasive for metal oxides, especially when the metal is not in its highest oxidation state. Thus for every three "missing"  ions, the crystal contains two  ions to balance the charge. The composition of a non-stoichiometric compound usually varies in a continuous manner over a narrow range. Nonstoichiometry is especially important in solid, three-dimensional polymers that can tolerate mistakes. To some extent, entropy drives all solids to be non-stoichiometric. But for practical purposes, the term describes materials where the non-stoichiometry is measurable, usually at least 1% of the ideal composition.

Iron sulfides

The monosulfides of the transition metals are often nonstoichiometric. Best known perhaps is nominally iron(II) sulfide (the mineral pyrrhotite) with a composition  (x = 0 to 0.2). The rare stoichiometric  endmember is known as the mineral troilite. Pyrrhotite is remarkable in that it has numerous polytypes, i.e. crystalline forms differing in symmetry (monoclinic or hexagonal) and composition (and others). These materials are always iron-deficient owing to the presence of lattice defects, namely iron vacancies. Despite those defects, the composition is usually expressed as a ratio of large numbers and the crystals symmetry is relatively high. This means the iron vacancies are not randomly scattered over the crystal, but form certain regular configurations. Those vacancies strongly affect the magnetic properties of pyrrhotite: the magnetism increases with the concentration of vacancies and is absent for the stoichiometric .

Palladium hydrides
Palladium hydride is a nonstoichiometric material of the approximate composition  (0.02 < x < 0.58).  This solid conducts hydrogen by virtue of the mobility of the hydrogen atoms within the solid.

Tungsten oxides
It is sometimes difficult to determine if a material is non-stoichiometric or if the formula is best represented by large numbers. The oxides of tungsten illustrate this situation. Starting from the idealized material tungsten trioxide, one can generate a series of related materials that are slightly deficient in oxygen. Thus, the last species can be described with the stoichiometric formula , whereas the non-stoichiometric description   implies a more random distribution of oxide vacancies.

Other cases
At high temperatures (1000 °C), titanium sulfides present a series of non-stoichiometric compounds.

The coordination polymer Prussian blue, nominally  and their analogs are well known to form in non-stoichiometric proportions. The non-stoichiometric phases exhibit useful properties vis-à-vis their ability to bind caesium and thallium ions.

Applications

Oxidation catalysis
Many useful compounds are produced by the reactions of hydrocarbons with oxygen, a conversion that is catalyzed by metal oxides.  The process operates via the transfer of "lattice" oxygen to the hydrocarbon substrate, a step that temporarily generates a vacancy (or defect).  In a subsequent step, the missing oxygen is replenished by O2. Such catalysts rely on the ability of the metal oxide to form phases that are not stoichiometric.  An analogous sequence of events describes other kinds of atom-transfer reactions including hydrogenation and hydrodesulfurization catalysed by solid catalysts.  These considerations also highlight the fact that stoichiometry is determined by the interior of crystals: the surfaces of crystals often do not follow the stoichiometry of the bulk.  The complex structures on surfaces are described by the term "surface reconstruction".

Ion conduction
The migration of atoms within a solid is strongly influenced by the defects associated with non-stoichiometry.  These defect sites provide pathways for atoms and ions to migrate through the otherwise dense ensemble of atoms that form the crystals.  Oxygen sensors and solid state batteries  are two applications that rely on oxide vacancies.  One example is the CeO2-based sensor in automotive exhaust systems.  At low partial pressures of O2, the sensor allows the introduction of increased air to effect more thorough combustion.

Superconductivity

Many superconductors are non-stoichiometric. For example, yttrium barium copper oxide, arguably the most notable high-temperature superconductor, is a non-stoichiometric solid with the formula YxBa2Cu3O7−x. The critical temperature of the superconductor depends on the exact value of x.  The stoichiometric species has x = 0, but this value can be as great as 1.

History

It was mainly through the work of Nikolai Semenovich Kurnakov and his students that Berthollet's opposition to Proust's law was shown to have merit for many solid compounds. Kurnakov divided non-stoichiometric compounds into berthollides  and daltonides depending on whether their properties showed monotonic behavior with respect to composition or not. The term berthollide was accepted by IUPAC in 1960. The names come from Claude Louis Berthollet and John Dalton, respectively, who in the 19th century advocated rival theories of the composition of substances.  Although Dalton "won" for the most part, it was later recognized that the law of definite proportions had important exceptions.

See also
 F-Center
 Vacancy defect

References

Further reading
 F. Albert Cotton, Geoffrey Wilkinson, Carlos A. Murillo & Manfred Bochmann, 1999, Advanced Inorganic Chemistry, 6th Edn., pp. 202, 271, 316, 777, 888. 897, and 1145, New York, NY, USA:Wiley-Interscience, see , accessed 8 July 2015.
 Roland Ward, 1963, Nonstoichiometric Compounds, Advances in Chemistry series, Vol. 39, Washington, DC, USA: American Chemical Society, DOI 10.1021/ba-1964-0039, see , accessed 8 July 2015.
 J. S. Anderson, 1963, "Current problems in nonstoichiometry (Ch. 1)," in Nonstoichiometric Compounds (Roland Ward, Ed.), pp. 1–22, Advances in Chemistry series, Vol. 39, Washington, DC, USA: American Chemical Society, DOI 10.1021/ba-1964-0039.ch001, see , accessed 8 July 2015.

Solid-state chemistry
Inorganic chemistry
Non-stoichiometric compounds
General chemistry